This page documents all tornadoes confirmed by various weather forecast offices of the National Weather Service in the United States in May 2018. Tornado counts are considered preliminary until final publication in the database of the National Centers for Environmental Information.

United States yearly total

May

May 1 event

May 2 event

May 3 event

May 4 event

May 8 event

May 9 event

May 11 event

May 13 event

May 14 event

May 15 event

May 16 event

May 17 event

May 18 event

May 19 event

May 20 event

May 21 event

May 22 event

May 23 event

May 24 event

May 25 event

May 27 event
Florida event was associated with Tropical Storm Alberto.

May 28 event
South Carolina event was associated with Tropical Storm Alberto.

May 29 event

May 30 event

May 31 event

See also
 Tornadoes of 2018
 List of United States tornadoes in April 2018
 List of United States tornadoes from June to July 2018

Notes

References

2018 natural disasters in the United States
2018-related lists
Tornadoes of 2018
Tornadoes
2018, 05